The Tamil Nadu Industrial Investment Corporation Limited (TIIC), Limited is an institution owned by the government of Tamil Nadu and is intended as a catalyst for the development of small, medium and large scale industries in Tamil Nadu. It was established in 1949.

History
The Tamil Nadu Industrial Investment Corporation Limited (TIIC), a government company incorporated under the Companies Act 1913 and continues to be a government company under The Companies Act, 1956. The authorised share capital of the company is ₹300 crores and the paid up capital of the company is ₹283.4956 crores

Functions
TIIC as a State Level Financial Institution, offers long and medium term financial assistance to various industries including service sector in the following forms: 
 Term Loans 
 Term Loan and Working Capital Term Loans under the Single Window Scheme. 
 Special types of assistance like Bill Financing Scheme, etc.

References

External links
 Official Website of the Tamil Nadu Industrial Investment Corporation Limited

State industrial development corporations of India
Economy of Tamil Nadu
State agencies of Tamil Nadu
Government agencies established in 1949
Financial services companies of India
State financial corporations of India
State government finances in India
1949 establishments in India